Gymnopilus intermedius is a species of mushroom-forming fungus in the family Hymenogastraceae. It was described by mycologist Rolf Singer in 1951.

See also

 List of Gymnopilus species

References

intermedius
Fungi of North America
Taxa named by Rolf Singer
Fungi described in 1929